Echologics LLC is a Canadian engineering company based in Toronto that specializes in non-invasive acoustic detection of underground leaks and pipe condition assessment. It has conducted  completed projects in North America, Europe, Australia, South Africa, and Singapore that have minimized, the loss of millions of gallons of drinking water via leaking infrastructure. Echologics and Mueller Systems are both part of Mueller Water Products' Mueller Technologies reporting segment.

Products and Services
Echologics offers several pipeline leak detection products and services that can non-intrusively and non-invasively pinpoint leaks on pipes using a proprietary acoustic technology. The company touts a superior capability in detecting leaks in non-metallic and large-diameter pipes, which are more difficult to detect using acoustic methods because they are quiet.

Among the services Echologics offers are pipe condition assessment, including a specialized assessment solution for asbestos cement pipes, permanent leak monitoring systems, transmission main leak detection, and non-revenue water management. In 2012, Mueller Service Co., which provides assessment and remediation services to water utilities by combining field assessment with GIS development services, was consolidated under the Echologics brand.

Projects

Echologics Opens Innovation Site in Walkerton, Ontario
Echologics celebrated the opening of its new Innovation Site in Walkerton, Ontario on September 10, 2015. The Innovation Site is a large-scale research and development site for advancing innovations in water main leak detection and condition assessment technologies. The research and development center will allow Echologics' engineers to test new solutions, showcase capabilities for visiting water utilities and other customers, and provide operators with hands-on training experiences.

AT&T and IBM Bring IoT to Bear on Water Shortage
Drought is becoming a serious problem in the western U.S., and all over the world. Now, big companies are taking action, with the help of the IoT. AT&T, IBM and Mueller Water Products announced on June 1 that the three have developed a new solution using IoT technology to try and alleviate water shortages in urban environments. At the National Institute of Standards and Technology (NIST) Tech Expo, the brands announced the results of several recent test trials of the technology that took place in Atlanta, Los Angeles and Las Vegas.

Echologics Monitors Critical Water Transmission Main in Las Vegas
Echologics is monitoring a three-mile section of a critical water main beneath the Las Vegas Strip for the Las Vegas Valley Water District (LVVWD. Installed in 1963, the 30-inch water main supplies up to 7.5 million gallons of water per day to resorts, casinos and attractions, among other users. LVVWD is deploying Echologics' EchoShore-TX leak detection platform. The new smart technology platform is at the forefront of transmission main monitoring technologies and enables customers to better manage aging water pipeline infrastructure and reduce water loss due to leakage.

Leak Pinpointed at a Large Bottling Plant in China
In China, a large beverage bottling plant was losing approximately 40,000 gallons per day of treated supply water. Service crews had been searching for the leak for several weeks, but could not locate the leak due to the facility's complex piping, and the fact that the plant operations created a large amount of background noise. An Echologics field crew with the LeakFinder correlator was called to the site and located the leak within a day pinpointed underneath a section of concrete roadway surrounding the plant. Based on the rapid response and result, the company purchased LeakFinder correlators for its service crews, which have used the technology to locate leaks in other plants throughout China.

American Water and Echologics Partner on Leak Detection Project in Illinois
The Illinois Sustainable Technology Center partnered with American Water and Echologics to monitor leak detection within the Metropolitan Chicago area and saved 3.25 million gallons of non-revenue water.

City of Tampa Water Department
The City of Tampa Water Department secured a service agreement with Echologics in April 2012 to conduct widespread transmission main leak detection on approximately 7.5 miles of cast iron pipe in the city's water system.

United Water New Jersey
United Water New Jersey (UWNJ), a subsidiary of United Water, selected Echologics for a pilot survey to detect leaks in five miles of water mains composed of cast iron pipe, pre-stressed cylinder concrete, and reinforced concrete pipe.

Water Board of New Orleans
In 2010, the Water Board of New Orleans obtained Echologics' services in a year-long contract to assess the condition of selected water lines throughout the city, which sustained significant damage to its water infrastructure during Hurricane Katrina. Three Echologics engineers are assigned to the project contract and are available to detect and assess leaks 24 hours a day. In the project's first two weeks, Echologics detected leaks totaling 358,000 gallons daily.

References

Construction and civil engineering companies of Canada
Companies based in Toronto